The 2014 European Parliament election in Latvia was the election of the delegation from Latvia to the European Parliament in 2014.

Background
At the previous European Parliament election in Latvia in 2009, the country elected 8 MEPs. Upon entry into force of the Lisbon Treaty Latvia was awarded 1 additional MEP, again bringing the total number of MEPs representing Latvia to 9. Calculated from the results of the 2009 election, this MEP came from the Civic Union. For this election however, the number of MEP's representing Latvia was again reduced to 8.

Results

Elected MEPs

See also
2014 European Parliament election
Politics of Latvia
List of political parties in Latvia

References

External links
Central Election Commission
European Parliament Election Law

Latvia
European Parliament elections in Latvia
2014 in Latvia